St Peter and St Paul's Church is a Grade I listed parish church in the Church of England in Upton, Newark and Sherwood, Nottinghamshire.

History

The church dates form the 13th century. It was restored in 1820, 1867 and then in 1893 by Charles Hodgson Fowler.

The church is in a joint parish with: 
St Denis' Church, Morton
Holy Trinity Church, Rolleston

Organ

The current organ dates from 1900 and was built by Gray and Davison. A specification of the organ can be found on the National Pipe Organ Register.

References

Church of England church buildings in Nottinghamshire
Grade I listed churches in Nottinghamshire
13th-century church buildings in England
Peter and Paul